Casey of the Coast Guard was a 1926 American silent action film serial released in ten chapters, directed by William Nigh and written by Lewis Allen Browne. The film is now presumed lost.

Plot
John Casey (George O'Hara) is a Coast Guard officer stationed on Long Island Sound. He is both hated and feared by a band of smugglers headed by Diamond Kate. The serial unfolds with the smuggler gang choosing their strike against Casey on the night of the Cadet Coast Guard Ball.  Casey’s brother Frank answers the call that night and is killed in action against the smugglers. Casey vows to avenge the death of his brother.

Cast
George O'Hara as Ensign John Casey
Helen Ferguson as Doris Warren
J. Barney Sherry as John Warren
Coit Albertson as Malverni

Chapter titles
The Smugglers' Ruse
Shot In The Dark
Watchful Waiting
Under Suspicion
The Gas Chamber
Shot From The Depths
Contraband Channels
Smuggled Aliens
Meshes of The Law
Caught In The Net

See also
List of lost films

References

External links

Casey of the Coast Guard at SilentEra

1926 films
1926 lost films
1920s action adventure films
American action adventure films
American silent serial films
American black-and-white films
Films about the United States Coast Guard
Films directed by William Nigh
Lost action adventure films
Lost American films
Pathé Exchange film serials
1920s American films
Silent action adventure films
1920s English-language films